As We Speak is a studio album by David Sanborn, released in 1982 on Warner Bros. Records.

The album reached No. 70 on the Billboard 200, number 32 on Billboard's R&B Albums chart and number 1 on Billboard's Jazz Albums chart.

Track listing

Personnel 
 David Sanborn – alto saxophone (1, 4, 5, 7, 8), saxophone section (1, 4), soprano saxophone (2, 3, 6, 9)
 Don Freeman – keyboards, synthesizers (2, 7, 8)
 Michael Sembello – guitars, lead vocals (5, 9), backing vocals (5)
 Marcus Miller – bass guitar, synthesizers (4)
 Omar Hakim – drums, tambourine (4)
 Paulinho da Costa – percussion

Additional musicians
 George Duke – clavinet (1)
 Lance Ong – synthesizers (2, 8)
 James Skelton – Hammond B3 organ (4)
 Spike – synthesizer and IRT strings (5, 6, 8, 9)
 Buzz Feiten – rhythm guitar (1)
 Malando Gassama – percussion (5)
 Bob Mintzer – bass clarinet (1)
 Bill Evans – saxophone (4), saxophone section (4)
 Robert A. Martin – French horn (9)
 Cruz Baca Sembello – backing vocals (5, 9)

Production 
 Robert Margouleff – producer
 Howard Siegel – engineer, mixing 
 Karat Faye – second engineer
 Rudy Hill – assistant engineer 
 Gregg Mann – assistant engineer 
 Mike Morongell – assistant engineer 
 Wayne Yurglin – assistant engineer 
 Barbara Rooney – assistant engineer 
 Stephen Marcussen – mastering at Precision Lacquer (Hollywood, CA).
 Ilyce Weiner – production coordinator 
 Christine Sauers – art direction, design 
 Richard Seireeni – art direction
 Kohei Onashi – illustration 
 Michael Halsband – photography 
 Patrick Raines & Associates – management

 
Sources:

Charts

References

External links

1982 albums
Albums produced by Robert Margouleff
David Sanborn albums
Warner Records albums